The 1943 World Professional Basketball Tournament was the 5th edition of the World Professional Basketball Tournament. It was held in Chicago, Illinois, during the days of 15–18 March 1943 and featured 14 teams. It was won by the Washington Bears, which consisted of may former New York Rens players, who defeated the Oshkosh All-Stars 43–31 in the championship game. The Fort Wayne Zollner Pistons came in third after beating the Dayton Dive Bombers 58–52 in the third-place game. Curly Armstrong of Fort Wayne was named the tournaments Most Valuable Player.

Results

First round
14 March - Fort Wayne Zollner Pistons 57, Indianapolis Pure Oils 52
14 March - Detroit Eagles 33, Akron Collegians 31
14 March - Dayton Dive Bombers 46, Chicago Ramblers 41
14 March - Minneapolis Sparklers 45, South Bend Studebaker Champions 44

Quarter-finals
15 March - Oshkosh All-Stars 65, Detroit Eagles 36
15 March - Fort Wayne Zollner Pistons 48, Sheboygan Red Skins 40
15 March - Dayton Dive Bombers 44, Harlem Globetrotters 34
15 March - Washington Bears 48, Minneapolis Sparklers 21

Semi-finals
16 March - Washington Bears 38, Dayton Dive Bombers 30
16 March - Oshkosh All-Stars 40, Fort Wayne Zollner Pistons 39

Third place game

Championship game

Individual awards

All-Tournament First team
F - Pop Gates, Washington Bears 
F - Curly Armstrong, Fort Wayne Zollner Pistons (MVP)
C - Dolly King, Washington Bears
G - Charley Shipp, Oshkosh All-Stars
G - Buddy Jeannette, Sheboygan Red Skins

All-Tournament Second team
F - Ralph Vaughn, Oshkosh All-Stars 
F - Johnny Isaacs, Washington Bears
C - Hal Tidrick, Dayton Dive Bombers
G - Bobby McDermott, Fort Wayne Zollner Pistons
G - Zack Clayton, Washington Bears

References

External links
WPBT 1939-48 on apbr.org

World Professional Basketball Tournament